The Fathers of the Constitution were the seven political leaders who participated in the writing of the Spanish Constitution of 1978. 

Gabriel Cisneros, Miguel Herrero y Rodríguez de Miñón and José Pedro Pérez Llorca
represented the centre-right Union of the Democratic Centre; Manuel Fraga Iribarne, the right-wing People's Alliance; Gregorio Peces-Barba, the left-wing Spanish Socialist Worker's Party; Jordi Solé Tura, the Unified Socialist Party of Catalonia / Communist Party of Spain and Miguel Roca Junyent, of the Democratic Pact for Catalonia, represented the Catalan nationalists.

See also
Spanish transition to democracy
Spanish Constitution of 1978

References

Spanish transition to democracy
Septets